Brie is a soft cow's-milk cheese named after Brie, the French region from which it originated (roughly corresponding to the modern département of Seine-et-Marne). It is pale in color with a slight grayish tinge under a rind of white mould. The rind is typically eaten, with its flavor depending largely upon the ingredients used and its manufacturing environment.  It is similar to Camembert, which is native to a different region of France.  Brie typically contains between 60% and 75% butterfat, slightly higher than Camembert.

"Brie" is a style of cheese, and is not in itself a protected name, although some regional bries are protected.

Production 

Brie may be produced from whole or semi-skimmed milk. The curd is obtained by adding rennet to raw milk and warming it to a maximum temperature of 37 °C (98.6 °F). The  mold is filled with several thin layers of cheese and drained for approximately 18 hours. The cheese is then taken out of the moulds, salted, inoculated with cheese culture (Penicillium candidum, Penicillium camemberti, or Brevibacterium linens), and aged in a controlled environment for at least four or five weeks.

If left to mature for longer, typically several months to a year, the cheese becomes stronger in flavour and taste, the pâte drier and darker, and the rind also darker and crumbly, and it is called  (French for 'black brie').

Overripe brie contains an unpleasantly excessive amount of ammonia, produced by the same microorganisms required for ripening.

Nutrition 
A thirty-gram serving of brie contains  and 8.4 grams of fat, of which 5.26 grams are saturated fat. Brie is a good source of protein; a serving of brie can provide 5 to 6 grams of protein. Brie contains a good amount of both vitamin B12 and vitamin B2.

Varieties 
There are now many varieties of brie made all over the world, including plain brie, herbed varieties, double and triple brie and versions of brie made with other types of milk. Indeed, although brie is a French cheese, it is possible to obtain Somerset and Wisconsin brie. The French government officially certifies only two types of brie, Brie de Meaux and Brie de Melun. Some varieties of brie cheese are smoked.

Brie de Meaux 

Manufactured in the town of Meaux in the Brie region of northern France since the 8th century, it was originally known as the "Queen's Cheese", or, after the French Revolution, the "Queen of Cheeses," and was eaten by all social classes. It was granted the protection of Appellation d'origine contrôlée (AOC) status in 1980. It is produced primarily in the eastern part of the Parisian basin.

Brie de Melun 

It has a stronger flavour and more pungent smell. It is made with unpasteurised milk. Brie de Melun is also available in the form of "Old Brie" or black brie. It was granted the protection of AOC status in 1980.

French non-AOC bries 
The following French bries do not have AOC certification:
Brie de Montereau, Île-de-France, Brie de Nangis, Brie de Provins, Brie noir, Brie fermier, Brie d'Isigny, Brie de Melun bleu, Brie petit moulé, Brie laitier Coulommiers.

International bries 
Australia:
King Island Dairy, on King Island between Victoria and Tasmania, produces a range of cheeses sold as "brie", as does Jindi Cheese in Victoria and High Valley Mudgee Cheese Co in Mudgee, NSW.

UK:
Cornish Brie; Somerset Brie; Baron Bigod (made in Suffolk); Cenarth Brie (made in Wales); Morangie Brie (made in the Highlands, Scotland); Connage Clava Brie (made in Scotland).

US:
The Marin French Cheese Company in California has made an unaged cheese since 1865 described as "fresh brie".

Kolb-Lena, a Savencia Fromage & Dairy plant in Illinois has made Brie- and Camembert-style cheese since early 1900. Today still producing Brie under the brands: Alouette, Delice de France or award-winning soft cheese under Dorothy's.

Brazil:
Brazilian "brie" is made in the dairy region located in the Southern area of Minas Gerais state (bordering São Paulo and Rio de Janeiro states) and Southeast Minas Gerais (bordering Rio de Janeiro and Espírito Santo states).

Ireland:
Ireland produces various "brie" cheeses such as Wicklow Bán Brie, St. Killian Brie, and The Little Milk Company's Organic Irish Brie.

New Zealand has many brie-style cheeses. They vary from the huge Mainland brand with Creamy, Double Cream, and Blue varieties to craft cheesemakers such as Grinning Gecko.

Serving 
Brie is produced as a wheel; a segment, or a whole wheel, may be bought. The white rind is edible. The cheese is ready to eat when the outside is firm, and the inside is slightly bouncy and resilient. Underripe Brie is stiff to the touch; overripe Brie is creamier and almost runny. The cheese is sometimes served baked.

Storage 
Brie, like Camembert, is a soft cheese. Its softness allows the rapid widespread growth of bacteria and moulds if the cheese is not stored correctly. It is recommended that soft cheeses such as brie be kept refrigerated. The cheese should be kept in a tightly sealed container, tightly wrapped wax paper or plastic wrap to avoid contact with moisture and food-spoilage bacteria which will reduce the shelf life and freshness of the product. Cheese producers specify a "best before date", and say that the quality of the cheese will degrade beyond then. Cheese with blue or green mould may not be safe to eat; the mould may also have spread invisibly to apparently unaffected parts.

Comparison with Camembert 

Camembert is a similar soft cheese that is also made from cow's milk. Camembert is a much more recently developed cheese and is based on brie.  However, there are differences such as its origin, typical market shape, size, and flavour. Brie originates from the Île-de-France while Camembert comes from Normandy. Traditionally, brie was produced in large wheels, 23 to 37 cm (9 to 14.5 in) in diameter, and thus ripened more slowly than the smaller Camembert cheeses. When sold, brie segments typically have been cut from the larger wheels (although some brie is sold as small, flat cylinders), and therefore its sides are not covered by the rind. By contrast, Camembert is ripened as a small round cheese 10 cm (4 in) in diameter by about 3 cm (1.25 in) thick and fully covered by rind. This ratio change between rind and paste makes Camembert slightly stronger when compared to a brie ripened for the same amount of time. Once the rind is cut on Camembert, the cheese typically has a more pungent aroma than does brie. In terms of taste, Camembert has a stronger, slightly sour, and sometimes chalky taste. The texture of Camembert is softer than that of brie, and if warmed, Camembert will become creamier, whereas brie warms without losing as much structure.

See also

 Neufchâtel cheese
 List of cheeses

References 

French cheeses
French products with protected designation of origin
Cow's-milk cheeses
Smoked cheeses